The Council of Economic Advisers (SOE) is an advisory body that is part of the Greek Ministry of Finance. The current Chairman of the Council is George Chouliarakis, also an Alternate Minister of Finance.

Purpose and role

According to Panos Tsakloglou, former Chairman of the Council of Economic Advisers, the Council is "the think tank of the government in economic issues." It consists of "a board composed of academics, which meet regularly, and a scientific team that operates on a daily basis." Practically, it is responsible for representing Greece in EU and other international organisations' working groups, for monitoring the implementation of the memorandum, for carrying out various ad hoc duties within the Ministry of Finance, and for providing expertise to the Greek government when they request it.

The Chairman of the Council of Economic Advisers represents Greece in EU working groups and on the Economic and Financial Committee. They are also Greece's deputy at meetings of the Eurogroup and the Economic and Financial Affairs Council (ECOFIN). In April 2015, George Chouliarakis, then-Chairman, became Greece's representative to the 'Brussels Group' - the detailed technical negotiations taking place in Brussels over the third bailout package.

Composition

  Chairman – George Chouliarakis
 Marianthi Anastasatou
 Eirini Andriopoulou
 Christos Antonopoulos
 Andreas Katsaros

Source:

Past chairs and members

Past chairs include:

 George Chouliarakis, 2015–present
 Tassos Anastasatos, 2014–2015
 Christodoulos Stefanadis, 2014
 Panos Tsakloglou, 2012–2014
 George Zanias, 2009–2012
 Vassilis Rapanos, 2000–2004
 Yannis Stournaras, 1994–2000

Past members include: 

 Stavros Thomadakis

Sources:

References

Greek government-debt crisis
Economy of Greece
1987 establishments in Greece